Mylara Lingeshwara Temple is a Hindu temple dedicated to the god (Mailara dynasty), a form of the god Shiva in Mylara. Located at center of Karnataka, It is in the extreme south-western corner of Hoovina Hadagali taluk, Vijayanagara district, Karnataka, India. It is 2 km from Tungabhadra river and 36 km  from Hadagali 36  km from Ranebennur and 39 km from Harapanahalli

According to legend
Mallasura (demon) and his brother performed a severe penance extracted from Brahma and, with a promise that they should never be harmed by any human being, began to harass the sages or rishis. The sages appealed Shiva to protect them; Shiva took on a new form and, taking with him his forces of seven crores goravas, warred with Mallasura and his brother Manikasura for 10 days> He then slew them both with his bow. During the battle, Lord Veerabhadra, Shiva's aide, struck the earth with his long hair and Kanchaveeras emerged from the spot. The Kanchaveeras confronted Mallasura and Manikasura and handed them over to Mailara. After killing Mallasura and Manikasura, Mailara (Shiva) wore their intestines as his turban, their teeth as a cowrie necklace, their mouths as a damaruga (hand drum), skulls as a doni (meal bowl) and their skins as a long coat. The fat of the demons was used as oil and their nerves as the lamp wick.

Karnika Utsava (prophecy)
Rituals during the Mylar Jatre (fair) include the Karanika Utsava (bow-climbing and prophecy-uttering ritual) and Pavada (body piercing ritual). Karanika Utsava is performed by the Karanika gorava, who fasts for 12 days, after which he climbs a 12-meter bow and utters a euphoric prophecy regarding regional agriculture, animal husbandry, and politics.

Karnikotsava Gorava's utterance tumbida koda mooru bhaga aadeethale parakh! means "A full pot may get split into three parts". Karnikotsava means the prophecy; it is like a puzzle. Some guess it to be an indication of political situation in the state and some guess about rain and crop that means it is an indication of some threat to the agriculture so, the prophecy warns the farmers to be very careful. It is believed that the saying would indicate the future of the coming year.

Goravara kunita

The gorava dance (goravara kunita), a dance of the Shiva cult, is popular in areas of North Karnataka. The goravas worship Mylara linga (Shiva), wear the costume of a black woolen rug, on shoulder hanging bag made out of skin. Some of them wear a black coat and white dhoti. In traditional contexts, the gorava devotees who dance in trance sometimes bark like dogs. It is believed that the totem of the Mylaralinga is a dog. The dancers' feet move in clockwise and zigzag forms. Gorava wears yellow powder on his forehead and gives it to his believed devotees. Artists holds instruments, like damaru (percussion), or sometime holds kolalu (flute), and a few artists wear a small bronze bell on their shoulders. A few followers hold cowbells called paarigante.

References

Hindu temples in Vijayanagara district
Shiva temples in Karnataka